Äntligen på väg is a 1996 studio album from Swedish singer Lotta Engbergs. The album peaked at #13 on the Swedish album chart.

Track listing

Chart positions

References 

1996 albums